Fusarium oxysporum f.sp. dianthi is a fungal plant pathogen infecting carnations.

References

External links
 USDA ARS Fungal Database

oxysporum f.sp. dianthi
Fungal plant pathogens and diseases
Ornamental plant pathogens and diseases
Forma specialis taxa
Fungi described in 1899